Events in the year 1944 in Turkey.

Parliament
 7th Parliament of Turkey

Incumbents
President – İsmet İnönü 
Prime Minister – Şükrü Saracoğlu

Ruling party and the main opposition
  Ruling party – Republican People's Party (CHP)

Cabinet
 14th government of Turkey

Events
18 January – Marine accident in Bandırma. 24 deaths
1 February – 1944 Bolu–Gerede earthquake (north west Anatolia) 3959 deaths
31 March – Turkish cargo ship Krom was torpedoed (Although the freight was wheat, the name of the ship was Krom (Chromium) and it was probably torpedoed because it was assumed that its freight might be chromium to Germany) 
4 June – End of Ottoman Public Debt Administration (after 90 years)
2 August – End of diplomatic relations with Germany
6 October – The 1944 Gulf of Edremit–Ayvacik earthquake triggers a tsunami and kills at least 73 people.
7 December – Turkey joined the International Aviation Agreement

Births
15 March – Nebahat Çehre, actress
4 April – Toktamış Ateş, academic
17 August – Semra Sezer, teacher, wife of former president Ahmet Necdet Sezer
19 September – İsmet Özel, poet
12 October – Abdülkadir Aksu , politician
14 October – Şerif Gören, movie director
11 November – Kemal Sunal, actor
17 December – İlhan Erdost, publisher

Deaths
14 January – Mehmet Emin Yurdakul, poet
8 March – Hüseyin Rahmi Gürpınar, writer
23 August – Abdülmecid II, caliph and a member of the Ottoman dynasty (died in exile)
11 November – Münir Ertegün, diplomat

Gallery

References

 
Years of the 20th century in Turkey
Turkey
Turkey
Turkey